The 1967 24 Hours of Le Mans was the 35th Grand Prix of Endurance, and took place on 10 and 11 June 1967.  It was also the seventh round of the 1967 World Sportscar Championship.

Ferrari were second and third, and these top-three cars all broke the 5000 km mark in total distance covered for the first time. All overall records were broken – fastest, furthest, a new lap record and biggest engine to win, along with a number of class records.

Regulations
After the previous year's complete change in the CSI (Commission Sportive Internationale - the FIA’s regulatory body) – the FIA Appendix J – there were no significant changes or updates to the regulations.

They also now required all cars to qualify to be within 85% of the pole-position car’s average speed. There was also about a 2.5% increase to the minimum distances on the Index of Performance.

Entries
Once again there was a marked imbalance between the categories with only six Sports Cars and seven GTs versus the 41 Prototypes in the starting line-up. It brought together the best of the world’s racing drivers with 37 who had, or would, race in Formula 1. There were five World Champions and in the previous month, eleven drivers had raced in the Monaco Grand Prix and seven in the Indy 500.

Entry list for the 1967 24 Hours of Le Mans:

Defending champions Ford, along with Porsche, had the biggest representation with ten cars. The new Ford GT40 Mark IV was an updated version of the Ford J-Car, which was shelved following the fatal accident of Ken Miles in August 1966 (The Mk III being a small-production road-car). The Mark IV had an all new chassis designed and built in the United States. The big-block 427 cu in (7-litre) Ford Galaxie-derived engine from the Mk.II was now pushing out 530 bhp. Four cars were ready for Le Mans: two for Shelby American who had the American pair of Dan Gurney and A. J. Foyt in one car and defending champion Bruce McLaren with Mark Donohue in the other. The team had to fabricate a roof "bubble" to accommodate the helmet of Dan Gurney, who stood more than 190 cm (6 feet, 3 inches) tall. The other two went to Holman & Moody with its teams of Mario Andretti/Lucien Bianchi and Denny Hulme/Lloyd Ruby.

After a humiliating loss to the Ferrari works team at the opening round at Daytona (who finished 1-2-3) Ford had won the next round at Sebring with Mario Andretti and Bruce McLaren driving the new Mk IV. For safety in numbers, Ford also entered three Mk IIB's (lightened versions of the previous year's car) run by Shelby American (Ronnie Bucknum/Paul Hawkins), Holman & Moody (Frank Gardner/Roger McCluskey) and Ford France (Jo Schlesser/Guy Ligier)

This year Ferrari chose to concentrate its efforts on the large-Prototype category. The latest evolution of the 250P, the 330 P4 had new bodywork, a better gearbox and the engine reworked, now putting out 450 bhp. Although lighter and with far better handling, it could not match the big Fords on sheer straight-line pace. Four were built and all were at Le Mans. The works team, now under Franco Lini, brought three of the cars. F1 team drivers Chris Amon and Lorenzo Bandini had won at Daytona and Monza but after Bandini was killed at Monaco Amon drove with Nino Vaccarella in the open-top, spyder, version. Team regulars Ludovico Scarfiotti/Mike Parkes had the second and Klass/Sutcliffe the third. The other P4 was run by the Equipe Nationale Belge for Willy Mairesse/”Beurlys”.

There were also three updated P3's (now called the 412 P) for the other customer teams: Maranello Concessionaires (Richard Attwood/Piers Courage), Scuderia Filipinetti (Jean Guichet/Herbert Müller) and the North American Racing Team (NART) for Pedro Rodriguez/Giancarlo Baghetti. NART also ran their older modified-P2 again.

After the success in 1966, John Wyer and Ford had split amicably. J.W. Automotive had purchased the Ford Advanced Vehicles facility and set about adapting the GT40. With a new narrow-cockpit body design by Len Bailey, the Mirage M1 had new suspension and carried the 351 cu in (5.75L) Ford engine. After Jacky Ickx and Dick Thompson sensationally won the Spa 1000km, race two cars were entered for Le Mans. Ickx co-drove with Alan Rees and Thompson had David Piper.

Also rewarded for their work with the Ford GT project, Lola Cars returned to Le Mans with the new T70. John Surtees had won the inaugural Can Am series in North America with a Chevrolet V8 engine. The Mk3 GT version was taken to Le Mans, now powered by an Aston Martin engine developing 450 bhp. Surtees had David Hobbs as co-driver, with a second car for Chris Irwin/Peter de Klerk

The most striking cars this year were the two Chaparrals. The new model 2F had a high-mounted adjustable wing pushing down on the rear wheels. It was now fitted with a Chevrolet big-block 427 cu in (7-litre) that produced over 550 bhp through a three-speed automatic transmission. Previous race-winner Phil Hill raced with Mike Spence with Bruce Jennings/Bob Johnson in the second car.

Once again, Porsche arrived with a new Carrera variant – the 910 was lower and lighter than the homologated 906. With a bigger 2.2L engine it had performed consistently in the season so far, culminating in a victory in the Targa Florio, But for Le Mans, the team was cautious and went back to the 2.0L engines (fuel-injected for 220 bhp) in two cars, for Rolf Stommelen/Jochen Neerpasch and Targa Florio winners Udo Schütz/Joe Buzzetta. However, the team also introduced another new car: the longtail 907 built almost specifically for the Mulsanne Straight. Two cars were present, driven by 1964 race-winner Jochen Rindt with current Hillclimb champion Gerhard Mitter and Jo Siffert/Hans Herrmann.

As neither Alfa Romeo nor Dino showed, Porsche's main opposition would be from Matra. Their new MS630 still used the 2-litre BRM engine, but it was built to also be capable of carrying the Ford 4.7-litre V8 (which was tried at the April test weekend) as well as a new Matra 3-litre engine still being developed. Although capable of 290 km/h (180 mph) its handling meant it was still slower than the Porsche. The same driver-combinations returned: Jean-Pierre Beltoise/Johnny Servoz-Gavin alongside Jean-Pierre Jaussaud/Henri Pescarolo.

Last present in 1964, Team Elite returned to Le Mans with the new Lotus 47, the race version of the Lotus Europa. Colin Chapman’s new design was fitted with a 165 bhp Ford 1.6-litre twin-cam engine.

Alpine arrived with seven entries of its A210 including two for its customer team, Ecurie Savin-Calberson. A range of the Renault-Gordini engine were offered in 1000, 1300 and 1500cc; that latter engine was raced by veterans Mauro Bianchi/Jean Vinatier. There was also an older M64 entered by NART. The two drivers, Therier and Chevallier, had been chosen from 200 applicants in a speed-trial by team-owner Luigi Chinetti.

After bring the Mini-Marcos to Le Mans in 1966, this year Frank Costin came up with an unusual aerodynamic design for privateer racer Roger Nathan. With a plywood frame, fibreglass bodywork, it had a 1-litre Hillman Imp engine mounted at a 54° angle, putting out 97 bhp. And making up the class were the returning entries from CD-Peugeot, Marcos and Austin-Healey.

There were only six cars in the Group 4 Sports Cars category, as many of the prototypes could not be produced in sufficient numbers. Ford had entered three GT40s in for Ford France, Scuderia Filipinetti and John Wyer’s J.W. Automotive.
Porsche entered a standard 906 for Ben Pon and Vic Elford, making his Le Mans debut, as well as French privateer Christian Poirot. Abarth was back at Le Mans for the first time since 1962, with the French Ecurie du Maine running one of the new 1300 GT. It had Abarth’s own 1.3-litre DOHC engine, that developed 147 bhp.

In a similarly small field, there were only the seven entrants in the Group 3 GT category. The Scuderia Filipinetti and Equipe Nationale Belge teams supplemented their Prototype entries with Ferrari 275 GTBs. They were up against Belgian privateer Claude Dubois, running a burly Shelby-modified Ford Mustang GT350, and an American-entered second generation Corvette Stingray. Finally, there were four Porsche 911 S, as the car started becoming the privateer’s car of choice.

This year also saw the increasing significance of the “war” between the tyre-companies, as they partnered with major manufacturers: Goodyear with Ford, Firestone with Ferrari, Dunlop with Porsche and Michelin with Alpine.

Practice
At the April Test Weekend, Bandini was fastest in the Ferrari P4 spyder with a sensational lap record of 3:25.4, ahead of Parkes in the other P4, then Surtees in the Lola (3:31.9). Although Donohue could reach  in the Ford MkIV. he could only get 4th fastest time (3:32.6). The weekend also had tragedy when Roby Weber in the new Matra lost control at full speed on Mulsanne Straight. The car skidded and somersaulted off the track. Trapped in the burning car Weber died before marshals could reach the accident in time.

By race week, Ford had made further aerodynamic improvements and the MkIVs were going even faster. However the cars were very unstable at high speed creating a lot of concern among the drivers, and all the cars had problems with their windscreens cracking and popping out at the high speeds The Ferrari team was not without its own problems: the NART P2, going slow, got in the way of Klass’ P4 sending him off into the trees and wrecking the car but leaving the driver uninjured. Pole position went to Bruce McLaren (3:24.4), just ahead of the surprisingly rapid Chaparral of Phil Hill (3:24.7). Then came the Fords of Andretti, Hulme, Bucknum and Gardner before Parkes’ Ferrari down in 7th with 3:28.9.

Initially qualified with their 5.7-litre engines, the Mirages then both had failures and JWA decided to change back to the 5.0-litre engines. However, the scrutineers pointed out that this could not be done as the cars still carried the larger fuel tanks for the 5.0+ class. Ford, however, managed to supply two engines slightly larger than 5 litres to allow the cars to race. The Team Elite Lotus had a similar problem but resolved theirs by putting empty plastic bottles in the fuel tank.

All speeds were up and during the race twenty cars were recorded doing over 300 km/h over a flying kilometre on the Mulsanne Straight:

Race

Start
Although the day started overcast, the race started in fine weather. Bucknum's Ford and Rodriguez's NART P3 were first away, while both Chaparrals were among the last as Jim Hall insisted on his drivers doing up their full race-harness before leaving. At the end of the first lap it was the Mk IIBs of Bucknum and Gardner leading Gurney's MkIV, then the Ferraris of Rodriguez and Amon, and Surtees in the Lola. On the fourth lap the Lola's engine broke a piston. Spence meanwhile made great pace to work his way back up the field.

Early visitors to the pits included Hulme's Mk IV to fix a sticking throttle, Bianchi's Mk IV to check his windscreen after an errant stone cracked it and Gardner's Ford for a new front tyre. Dubois brought the Shelby Mustang in missing half its front spoiler after bumping fenders in the startline rush and Jaussaud because his Matra's door wouldn't shut properly. Bucknum continued to lead past the first hour, up to the first pitstops. After all the leaders had pitted, it was Foyt now leading from Hill in the Chaparral and the Fords of Andretti and McLaren with Parkes in 5th.

Suddenly Mike Salmon's JWA Ford GT burst into flames at over 300 km/h down the back straight with a full tank of fuel. Salmon bravely got the car near to a marshal post at Mulsanne corner before jumping out but was taken to hospital with severe 2nd and 3rd-degree burns. After two hours, the three Americans Foyt, Hill and Andretti (33 laps) already had a lap on the Ferraris and the rest of the field. After his early delay, Hulme then set a new lap record of 3:23.6, faster than the record pole time. The Ferraris were playing a long game, driving within their capability to last the distance. The Porsches of Siffert/Herrmann and Mitter/Rindt, now up to 14th and 15th overall, had a comfortable lead in the Index of Performance. However the big British cars were all out before dark: both the Mirages and the second Lola gone with engine issues after running outside the top-10.

Night
Soon after 10pm, as night was falling, Amon's Ferrari suffered a puncture while running 5th. Because of a faulty mallet he could not change the tyre out on the track and while crawling back to the pits, sparks from the wheel hub started a fire in the engine. Amon was forced to bale out quickly (unharmed) at a distance from any marshal posts and the car was burnt to a wreck. Not long later the Chaparral had to pit with its aileron stuck in the brake position, making the car lose about 20 km/h off its top speed. Bucknum lost two hours to get a water-pipe rewelded then had to creep around for two laps to reach the mandatory 25-lap minimum for liquids replenishment Twice Lloyd Ruby ditched his Ford in the Mulsanne corner sandtrap, losing all the time Hulme had made up having to get repairs to the undertray. The second incident proved terminal.

The Rodriguez/Baghetti NART Ferrari had slipped down the field and retired after 2am with a burnt piston. By 3am Ford was 1-2-3 with Gurney (182 laps) leading Andretti (who had recently matched Hulme's lap record) and McLaren by three laps. At 3:35 am, still running second, Andretti pitted J-7, the #3 Mk IV. A. J. Foyt, who had brought in J-5, the #1 Mk IV at the same time, was complaining loudly about his American rival's aggressive driving. Distracted by this “discussion,” a mechanic changing the front brake pads on J-7 installed a pad backward (which could be done). Andretti accelerated out of the pits and under the Dunlop bridge, but when he braked for the first time, from high speed going into the Esses, the incorrectly installed front brake locked, and J-7 spun, hitting the earth banks and ending up in disarray in the middle of the track.  Andretti, with three broken ribs, leapt out and behind the wall. (It later transpired that Bianchi was right and the brakes had been put in back to front) Soon behind him at speed came McCluskey (9th) who deliberately hit the other wall believing the wreck might still have the driver trapped inside, then Schlesser (6th) who tried to weave between the two. Both crashed and suddenly Ford were down three cars. McCluskey, carrying the injured Andretti, commandeered a marshal's car and drove back to the Ford medical centre.

McLaren picked up a second puncture going through the debris, and then lost more time with clutch issues. To top it off, the rear engine bonnet later flew off racing down the Mulsanne straight and another 45 minutes were lost retrieving and refitting it, dropping them to 6th.

This left the Gurney/Foyt car with a 5-lap lead and elevated the Parkes/Scarfiotti Ferrari to second and the Hill/Spence Chaparral fighting back up to third. During the night, Gurney had eased off a little to preserve his car, and Parkes came up behind in the second-place Ferrari to unlap himself. For several miles Parkes hounded the Ford, flashing his lights in Gurney's mirrors until an exasperated Gurney simply pulled over at Arnage corner and stopped on a grass verge. Parkes stopped behind him, and the two race leaders sat there in the dark, motionless. Finally, Parkes conceded his attempt at provoking a race with Gurney was not going to work and he pulled out and resumed the race, with Gurney following shortly after. The Siffert/Herrmann Porsche still led the Index of Performance although it was now being chased by the improving Alpine of Larrousse/Depailler.

Morning
Dawn arrived clear and cold, with little mist this year. The Chaparral developed an oil-leak in the transmission dropping it down the order and then eventual retirement. The Belgian Ferrari P4 had been having a consistent race and slotted into third, with the other P4 of Klass/Sutcliffe now in fourth. However, a broken fuel-injection pump forced their retirement mid-morning. The Corvette retired with a broken conrod while leading the GT category.

Bucknum and Hawkins, early race-leaders, had driven hard to get back up to 6th after their overnight delay when they were finally halted by engine issues at 9.40am. So by 10am, the three-quarter mark, there were only 16 cars still running. Gurney and Foyt had already covered 293 laps, twenty more than McLaren and Amon had the previous year at the same time. With a decent lead, the leading Ford could afford to drop its lap times by 30 seconds a lap. Even though the Ferraris were lapping 10 seconds a lap faster and could go 20% further between fuel-stops, they were unable to make significant inroads, and the remaining quarter of the race was largely uneventful.

Finish and post-race

In the end it was a comfortable victory for the all-American Ford with Gurney and Foyt winning by four laps, having led for all but the first 90 minutes of the race. Theirs was the only one of the ten Fords that did not have any issues throughout the race. Perhaps surprisingly for such a big engine, they also won the Index of Thermal Efficiency from their record distance covered. Ferrari salvaged some pride after the previous year's debacle with second and third, with McLaren/Donohue fighting back to fourth.

Siffert and Herrmann were 5th in their Porsche 2-litre, covering just 12 km less than the 1966 winners. They led home four more Porsches including Pon/Elford in 7th, being the first Group 4 car home. The privateer Porsche in 8th just beat the Alpine of Grandsire/Rosinski who won the 1300-class. The Swiss Ferrari GTB of Spoerry/Steinemann was the first GT home, coming 11th, nine laps ahead of the French 911. The Austin-Healey, perennial finishers, was the only British car to make it to the end, in 15th. The little Abarth, after a race bedevilled by issues, did finish (in last place) but had not completed enough laps to be classified.

When the winners mounted the victory stand, Gurney was handed the traditional magnum of champagne. Looking down, he saw Ford CEO Henry Ford II, team owner Carroll Shelby, their wives, and several journalists who had predicted disaster for the high-profile duo of Gurney and Foyt. They had said that the two drivers, who were strongly competitive in the United States, would break their car in intramural rivalry. Instead, both drivers took special care to drive the car with discipline and won easily. On the victory stand, Gurney shook the bottle and sprayed everyone nearby, establishing a tradition re-enacted in victory celebrations the world over ever since.
"What I did with the Champagne was totally spontaneous. I had no idea it would start a tradition. I was beyond caring and just got caught up in the moment. It was one of those once-in-a-lifetime occasions where things turned out perfectly… I thought this hard-fought victory needed something special”.

Gurney, incidentally, autographed and gave the bottle of champagne to Life Magazine photographer, Flip Schulke, who used it as a lamp for 30 years. Schulke later returned the bottle to Gurney, who placed it in his All American Racers team headquarters’ boardroom in California.

Chaparral got its due reward a month later with the only victory for the 2F at Brands Hatch. It was a suitable finale for Phil Hill, 1961 F1 World Champion to retire from a distinguished sports-car racing career that included three Le Mans victories.

Official results

Finishers
Results taken from Quentin Spurring's book, officially licensed by the ACO Class Winners are in Bold text.

 'Note *: Not Classified because Insufficient distance covered.

Did Not Finish

Did Not Start

Class Winners

 Note: setting a new Distance Record.

Index of Thermal Efficiency

 Note: Only the top ten positions are included in this set of standings.

Index of Performance
Taken from Moity's book.

 Note: Only the top ten positions are included in this set of standings. A score of 1.00 means meeting the minimum distance for the car, and a higher score is exceeding the nominal target distance.

Statistics
Taken from Quentin Spurring's book, officially licensed by the ACO
 Fastest Lap in practice – B.McLaren, #2 Ford Mk IV – 3:24.4secs; 
 Fastest Lap – D.Hulme, #4 Ford Mk IV / M.Andretti #3 Ford Mk IV – 3:23.6secs; 
 Distance – 
 Winner's Average Speed – 
 Attendance – 310 000

Challenge Mondial de Vitesse et Endurance Standings
As calculated after Le Mans, Round 4 of 4

Citations

References
 Armstrong, Douglas – English editor (1967)    Automobile Year #15 1967-68    Lausanne: Edita S.A.
 Clarke, R.M. - editor (1997)    Le Mans 'The Ford and Matra Years 1966-1974'    Cobham, Surrey: Brooklands Books  
 Clausager, Anders (1982)    Le Mans    London: Arthur Barker Ltd  
 Fox, Charles (1973)    The Great Racing Cars & Drivers    London: Octopus Books Ltd  
 Laban, Brian (2001)    Le Mans 24 Hours    London: Virgin Books   
 Moity, Christian (1974)    The Le Mans 24 Hour Race 1949-1973    Radnor, Pennsylvania: Chilton Book Co  
 Spurring, Quentin (2010)    Le Mans 1960-69    Yeovil, Somerset: Haynes Publishing

External links
  Racing Sports Cars – Le Mans 24 Hours 1967 entries, results, technical detail. Retrieved 9 April 2018
  Le Mans History – Le Mans History, hour-by-hour (incl. pictures, YouTube links). Retrieved 9 April 2018
  World Sports Racing Prototypes – results, reserve entries & chassis numbers. Retrieved 9 April 2018
  Team Dan, as archived at web.archive.org – results & reserve entries, explaining driver listings. Retrieved 2 May 2022
  Unique Cars & Parts – results & reserve entries. Retrieved 9 April 2018
  Formula 2 – Le Mans results & reserve entries. Retrieved 9 April 2018
  YouTube – American colour news report about the start & the finish (3mins).  Retrieved 9 April 2018
  YouTube – Colour personal footage with music  overlaid (7mins).  Retrieved 9 April 2018
  YouTube – Colour personal 8mm footage (10mins).  Retrieved 9 April 2018
  YouTube – B/w footage, in Spanish (4mins).  Retrieved 9 April 2018

24 Hours of Le Mans races
Le Mans
1967 in French motorsport